Paulus Johannes Zimmerman (born 8 November 1958), better known as Paul Zimmerman, is a Dutch-born Hong Kong environmentalist, politician and businessman. He is a member of the Southern District Council for Pokfulam and CEO of Designing Hong Kong, a group that advocates better urban design.

Early life and business career
Zimmerman was born in Rotterdam, Netherlands in 1958, and grew up in the town of Woerden. He set up a student union in high school and joined the editorial board of an underground newspaper. When he was 17, in response to the dismissal of several popular teachers, Zimmerman took part in a demonstration in which protesters barricaded the building. The school was closed for a week and the offending headmaster replaced.

He pursued a Master's programme in Social Science (Economics) at Erasmus University in Rotterdam. While there, he got into politics with the Democrats 66 (D66).

In 1984, he moved to Hong Kong as a three-month trainee in a Dutch bank to avoid conscription. Deciding against a banking career, by 1987 he had started his own business, a graphic design firm called Bridge Design, and sold it 10 years later to Caribiner International, organisers of the Hong Kong Handover. He continued to work for what later became communications agency Jack Morton until 2001.

In 2000, he founded a strategy and policy consultancy called the Experience Group.

In the early 2000s, Zimmerman worked alongside businessman Chung Po-yan on a project that later became Designing Hong Kong Harbourfront District, a non-governmental organisation devoted to improving Hong Kong's waterfronts and promoting liveable density. The Government set up the Harbourfront Enhancement Committee in 2004 in response to the project. The project was converted into a company, Designing Hong Kong Limited, founded by him together with Christine Loh, Peter Wong and Markus Shaw.

He was an executive director at investments umbrella company Jebsen Travel International from 2003 to 2010. He remains on the Board as a non-executive director. He retired from the position to focus his efforts on Designing Hong Kong and the Southern District Council.

He is currently the vice-chairman of the Coalition on Sustainable Tourism and Chairman of the Single-Use Beverage Packaging Working Group, best known for its initiative Drink Without Waste. He is also Chairman of the Professional Commons and director of the Civic Exchange. In 2015, he became the chairman of the Hong Kong Democratic Foundation.

He is an Honorary Member of the American Institute of Architects for his work on the harbourfront.

He rides motorcycles, and enjoys mountaineering, paragliding, sailing and scuba diving.

Political career

In 2006, lawmakers Audrey Eu Yuet-mee, Albert Lai Kwong-tak and Ronny Tong Ka-wah asked Zimmerman to join the Civic Party as a founding member. He represented the Civics in a run for a Tourism Subsector seat on the Hong Kong Election Committee in 2006 but was not elected.

In the 2007 District Council election, Zimmerman ran against Wong Wang-tai in Stubbs Road in Wan Chai District Council, an upper-middle-class constituency, but lost by a margin of 129 votes. He later won a seat in Pokfulam in the Southern District Council in a by-election in 2010, succeeding Ronald Chan Ngok-pang who resigned after being hired by the Chief Executive's Office. He was re-elected in 2011 and 2015.

His first bid for the Legislative Council was in 2008 when he ran in the Tourism functional constituency. He lost in a four-way contest to independent Paul Tse, receiving 81 votes.

In 2012, Zimmerman intended to run in the territory-wide District Council (Second) "super seat" in the 2012 Legislative Council election and left the Civic Party when the party refused to nominate him. He gave up his Dutch citizenship but did not get enough nominations and subsequently endorsed another pro-democracy candidate Frederick Fung. He also ran in the 2012 election of the Hong Kong delegates to the National People's Congress but was not successful in an election better suited to pro-Beijing candidates.

On 1 October 2014, Zimmerman took a yellow umbrella to protest at a China National Day reception in Hong Kong in the midst of the Occupy Central protests, in which thousands of activists took to the streets to protest at Chinese government's decision retarding democratic development.

In the 2016 Legislative Council election, Zimmerman ran in Hong Kong Island as an independent democrat. He dropped out of the race within a week of the election because he did not want to split the vote among pro-democratic candidates, but his name still appeared on the ballot.

He once again sought election in the 2016 Hong Kong Election Committee Subsector elections, this time in the Architectural, Surveying, Planning and Landscape Subsector. Of the 30 winners, Zimmerman had the most votes, 2524. He joined 20 other electors (from the 1,194 total) in nominating former judge Woo Kwok-hing for Chief Executive in the small-circle 2017 election.

In the 2019 District Council election, Zimmerman successfully won his re-election bid in the Pokfulam constituency, with 2,547 votes. He is vice-chairman of the Southern District Council.

Personal life
Besides his master's degree in Economics from Erasmus University, Zimmerman also obtained a master's degree in Transport Policy & Planning at the University of Hong Kong. He has married twice. With his first wife, he has two sons, born in 1993 and 1995. When he renounced Dutch citizenship during his short-lived LegCo bid, his younger son also lost his. He married his second wife Jannie in 2012. The couple had a daughter, born two years earlier.

References

External links 

 Official website
Southern District Council website
Designing Hong Kong website
Drink Without Waste

1958 births
Living people
Erasmus University Rotterdam alumni
Alumni of the University of Hong Kong
Dutch emigrants to Hong Kong
Hong Kong businesspeople
Hong Kong environmentalists
Hong Kong people of Dutch-Jewish descent
District councillors of Southern District
Independent politicians in Hong Kong
Civic Party politicians
Hong Kong Democratic Foundation politicians
Members of the Election Committee of Hong Kong, 2017–2021
Naturalised citizens of the People's Republic of China in Hong Kong
Dutch Jews
Hong Kong Jews
Jewish politicians